Monica the Medium is an American reality television series about Monica Ten-Kate, a student at Pennsylvania State University who  claims to be able to communicate with the dead. The show premiered August 25, 2015, on ABC Family. On October 26, 2015, the show got picked up for a second season that premiered on April 25, 2016.

Cast
Monica Ten-Kate
Krista Gray, Monica's roommate and best friend
Kayla Williams, Monica's roommate
Kirsten Johnson, Monica's roommate
Tyler, Monica's boyfriend

Episodes

Season 1 (2015)

Season 2 (2016)

References

External links
 
 

2010s American reality television series
2015 American television series debuts
2016 American television series endings
ABC Family original programming
English-language television shows
Freeform (TV channel) original programming
Television series by Lionsgate Television